Amerila astreus is a moth of subfamily Arctiinae described by Dru Drury in 1773. It is found from the Oriental region (including India, Sri Lanka) to New Guinea. The species is found in primary and secondary habitats ranging from lowlands to montane regions.

Description
Its palpi are crimson, with a black spot on each joint. Antennae red brown, with the basal joint crimson. Head and thorax whitish fuscous, the head with two black spots. Collar with two pairs of spots. Three segments of thorax are each with a pair of spots. Forewings with hyaline (glass like), with two black spots at the base. The margins, apical area, and a band on discocellulars pale fuscous. Hindwings hyaline, with a marginal fuscous band. Legs crimson, with the outer side of the femora and tibia whitish fuscous. Larva greenish with slightly hairy body. There are sub-dorsal and lateral rows of small black spots. Spiracles brownish. Head yellow.

Subspecies
Amerila astreus astreus
Amerila astreus communis (Walker, 1864)
Amerila astreus curtisi (Rothschild, 1910)
Amerila astreus novaeguineae (Rothschild, 1914)

References

 , 1780: De Uitlandsche Kapellen voorkomende in de drie Waereld-Deelen Asia, Africa en America [Papillons Exotiques des trois parties du monde l'Asie, l'Afrique & l'Amerique] 3: 1-176, t. CXCII-CCLXXXVII, Amsterdam, Utrecht.
 , 1773: Illustrations of Natural History. Wherein are exhibited upwards of two hundred and twenty figures of exotic insects, according to their different genera; very few of which have hitherto been figured by any author, being engraved and coloured from nature, with the greatest accuracy, and under the author's own inspection, on fifty copper-plates. With a particular description of each insect; interspersed with remarks and reflections on the nature and properties of many of them 2: 1-92, 50 pl., London.
 , 2010: Tiger-moths of Eurasia (Lepidoptera, Arctiidae) (Nyctemerini by ). Neue Entomologische Nachrichten 65: 1-106, Marktleuthen.
 , 1910: Catalogue of the Arctianae in the Tring museum, with notes and descriptions of new species. Novitates Zoologicae 17 (1): 1-85, (2): 113-188, pl. XI-XIV, 18: pl. III-VI, London and Aylesbury.

Moths described in 1773
Amerilini
Moths of Asia
Taxa named by Dru Drury